Eparchy of Parma may refer to:

Byzantine Catholic Eparchy of Parma
Ukrainian Catholic Eparchy of Saint Josaphat in Parma